R v De Simoni is a decision of the High Court of Australia.

The case is notable for the 'De Simoni principle', a doctrine that applies to criminal sentencing law. The rule 'bars sentencing judges from relying on facts that would amount to a more serious crime than the one the offender had been convicted of'. This rule prevents, for example, a judge from relying on aggravating facts in sentencing a manslaughter conviction; if those facts would imply the offender had actually committed a more serious offence.

According to LawCite, it is the 128th most cited case of the High Court.

Facts 

Luciano De Simoni pleaded guilty before a judge in the District Court of Western Australia to an indictment which alleged he 'stole from one Florence Kathleen Scott with actual violence $180 in money ... '.

A conviction was entered under the WA Criminal Code for the offence of robbery. The Crown then stated the material facts to the court. They were that the victim was a woman of 78 years; at the time of the robbery the respondent struck her with a heavy blow, inflicting a 10 cm wound on the back of her head which needed eight stitches. De Simoni's counsel did not dispute this account. The trial judge then sentenced him to seven years, with a non-parole period of four years.

The trial judge remarked:'In my view this is a shocking crime ... what you had done - struck from behind on the head with a piece of wood a 78-year-old woman. In my view this crime deserves punishment and substantial punishment'De Simoni appealed, claiming that the trial judge had exceeded his available discretion. The Court of appeal allowed his appeal, but on different grounds; the court held that the facts that De Simoni had wounded his victim, was something the trial judge had taken into account; and that this circumstance of aggravation was prohibited by s582 of the WA Criminal Code.

The state of Western Australia then appealed to the High Court.

Judgement 
The High Court overturned the court of appeal. It found that violence was already a factor within the sentencing provisions for robbery under the code; and that the trial judge had only taken into account the fact violence had been committed. They overturned a finding that the trial judge had taken into account the fact of the victim being wounded. However, the affirmed that if the trial judge had done so; it would have been an inappropriate consideration, as wounding would have implied a more serious offence than violent robbery.

The 'crucial question', according to the court, was whether: 'a judge can be said to rely upon a circumstance of aggravation within the meaning of s. 582, when he takes that circumstance into consideration in imposing a sentence, and by reason of it inflicts a penalty more severe than he would otherwise have imposed.' The High Court then found for Western Australia, and remitted the matter to the Court of Criminal Appeal to give consideration to grounds it had previously excluded under s582.

Significance 
De Simoni is an important case in Australian sentencing law, however it has some nuances that can occasionally make it difficult to understand and apply by lower court judges. Some questions associated with the doctrine were recently considered by the High Court in Nguyen v R and Betts v R.

While the decision was based on the WA Criminal Code, the rule in De Simoni still applies in Australia's common law criminal jurisdictions. Nyugen v R for example, was an appeal of sentence for a conviction recorded in NSW.

See also 

 Veen v R (No 2)

Notes

References 

High Court of Australia cases
Criminal law